Yangpyeong station is a railroad station in South Korea.

 Yangpyeong station (Seoul)
 Yangpyeong station (Yangpyeong)